The 1993 FIBA Under-19 World Championship for Women (Korean: 1993 FIBA 19 세 이하 세계 여자 선수권 대회) took place in South Korea from 1 to 8 August 1993. It was co-organised by the International Basketball Federation (FIBA) and Korea Basketball Association, the Korean national federation.

Twelve national teams competed for the championship. Australia came away with the Gold medal by defeating Russia 72-54 in the final.

Competing nations

Except Korea, which automatically qualified as the host nation, the 11 remaining countries qualified through their continents’ qualifying tournaments:

FIBA Africa (1)
 
FIBA Asia (4)
 
 
 
  Chinese Taipei

FIBA Americas (2)
 
 
FIBA Oceania (1)
 

FIBA Europe (4)

Final standings

Awards

References

External links
 Official Web of 1993 FIBA World Championship for Junior Women.

FIBA Under-19 Women's Basketball World Cup
World Championship for Women
1993 in South Korean sport
International women's basketball competitions hosted by South Korea
1993 in South Korean women's sport